The 1920 Detroit Heralds season was the 16th season for the Detroit Heralds, an independent American football team. Led by coach Bill Marshall, the team compiled a 2–3–3 record. The 1920 season was the team's first competing in the new American Professional Football Association (predecessor to the National Football League). The team finished in ninth place in the league.

Schedule 
The table below was compiled using the information from The Pro Football Archives, which used various contemporary newspapers. A dagger by a team means that team was not affiliated with the non-APFA. For the results column, the winning team's score is posted first followed by the result for the Heralds. For the attendance, if a cell is greyed out and has "N/A", then that means there is an unknown figure for that game. Green-colored rows indicate a win; yellow-colored rows indicate a tie; and red-colored rows indicate a loss.

Week 3: vs. Cleveland Panthers 

October 10, 1920, at Navin Field

The Heralds opened their season with a game against the Cleveland Panthers, played at Navin Field on October 10, 1920. The Heralds won by a 40-14 score.  Eddie Moegle, the Heralds' right halfback, scored the team's first touchdown of the 1920 NFL season.  Additional touchdowns were scored by left end Heinie Schultz, left tackle Hugh Lowery, substitute left end Joe Fitzgerald, substitute fullback Wood, and quarterback Perce Wilson.  Right tackle Steamer Horning converted four goals after touchdown for Detroit.  After "a mix-up" with Detroit's Charlie Guy and Gil Runkel, Cleveland's star halfback Arnold Vogel was carried off the field in the fourth quarter with a broken left shoulder and three broken ribs; he was taken to Detroit Receiving Hospital for medical treatment.  The Detroit Free Press called it "a rough and tumble match," but also wrote that it was "a slow and rather uninteresting football battle."

The Heralds' starting lineup against Columbus was Heinie Schultz (left end), Hugh Lowery (left tackle), Clarence Appelgran (left guard), Gil Runkel (center), Charlie Guy (right guard), Steamer Horning (right tackle), Ray Whipple (right end), Perce Wilson (quarterback), King (left halfback), Eddie Moegle (right halfback), and Pat Dunne (fullback). Jimmy Kelly (left halfback), Fitzgerald (left end), Wood (fullback), and McCoy (right tackle) appeared in the game as substitutes.

Week 4: at Chicago Tigers 

October 17, 1920, at Cub Park

The Heralds lost by a 12-0 score to the Chicago Tigers on October 17, 1920, in a game played at Cub Park in Chicago.

Week 5: vs. Columbus Panhandles 

October 24, 1920, at Mack Park

Following the loss, the Heralds were visited by the Columbus Panhandles, an APFA team. The Panhandles' passing attack helped them outgain the Heralds, but, according to the Ohio State Journal, it was a close game and "one play decided the outcome." The Heralds' left end, Joe Fitzgerald, intercepted a pass from Frank Nesser and ran it back for an 85-yard touchdown.

The Heralds' starting lineup against Columbus was Fitzgerald (left end), Hugh Lowery (left tackle), Moose Gardner (left guard), Gil Runkel (center), Charlie Guy (right guard), Steamer Horning (right tackle), Ray Whipple (right end), Bill Joyce (quarterback), Bo Hanley (left halfback), Jimmy Kelly (right halfback), and Pat Dunne (fullback). Perce Wilson (quarterback), Birtie Maher (left end) and Ty Krentler (fullback) appeared in the game as substitutes.

Week 6: at Chicago Cardinals 

October 31, 1920, at Cub Park

The Heralds lost to the Chicago Cardinals on October 31, 1920, in a game played at Cub Park in Chicago.  The game was a scoreless tie until the middle of the third period.  Over a five-minute period, the Cardinals blocked three punts by Steamer Horning.  Chicago scored touchdowns each time and won the game 21-0.

Week 8: at Fort Wayne Friars 

November 14, 1920, at League Park

On November 14, 1920, the Heralds played the Fort Wayne Friars to a scoreless tie at League Park in Fort Wayne, Indiana.  The game was called "one of the best games of football seen here this season."

Week 10: at Dayton Triangles 

November 25, 1920, at Triangle Park

Week 10: vs Lansing Oldsmobile 

November 28, 1920, at Mack Park

On November 28, 1920, the Heralds played to a scoreless tie against the Lansing Oldsmobile team on a muddy field at Mack Park.  The Heralds came closest to scoring on a long forward pass from Ernest Watson to Joe Fitzgerald who was downed at Lansing's six-yard line.  The Heralds were held on downs from the six-yard line.

The Heralds' starting lineup against Lansing was Blake Miller (left end), Hugh Lowery (left tackle), Gates (left guard), Gil Runkel (center), Tom Dickinson (right guard), Steamer Horning (right tackle), Joe Fitzgerald (right end), Ernest Watson (quarterback), Stan Jacobs (left halfback), Lynn Allen (right halfback), and Jimmy Kelly (fullback). Pat Dunne (fullback) and Perce Wilson (left halfback) appeared in the game as substitutes.

Week 11: vs. Detroit Maroons 

December 5, 1920, at Mack Park

The Heralds finished the 1920 season with a game against the Detroit Maroons for the city championship. Substitute fullback Ty Krentler scored the Heralds' touchdown in the final minute of the third quarter.  The Maroons tied the game with a touchdown in the fourth quarter by fullback Schultz.

Standings

Players
 Lynn Allen, kicker, 2 games, 170 pounds, 6' 0", University of Detroit
 Clarence Appelgran, guard, 4 games, 200 pounds, 6' 2", University of Illinois
 Chris Bentz, tackle, 2 games, 215 pounds, 6' 4", Northern State Univ., Montana
 Charlie Carman, 1 game, 215 pounds, 5' 10", Vanderbilt	
 Tom Dickinson, end, 3 games, 175 pounds, 5' 8", Syracuse
 Pat Dunne, fullback, 8 games, 182 pounds
 Russ Finsterwald, wingback, 2 games, 165 pounds, 5' 9", Ohio, Syracuse
 Joe Fitzgerald, end, 8 games, 150 pounds
 Moose Gardner, guard, 2 games, 220 pounds, 6' 1", Wisconsin
 Gates, 1 game 
 Charlie Guy, guard, 7 games, 170 pounds, 6' 0', Dartmouth, Washington & Jefferson
 Bo Hanley, wingback, 3 games, 150 pounds, 5' 7", Marquette
 Steamer Horning, tackle, 8 games, 198 pounds, 6' 0", Colgate
 Stan Jacobs, tailback, 3 games
 Marshall Jones, 1 game, 165 pounds, 5' 11", North Dakota
 Bill Joyce, quarterback, 1 game, 180 pounds, 5' 8", Holy Cross, Catholic
 Jimmy Kelly, tailback, 6 games, 160 pounds, 5' 9", St. Louis, Detroit 
 King, 1 game	
 Ty Krentler, fullback, 5 games, 160 pounds, Univ. of Detroit
 Alvin Loucks, 1 game, 170 pounds, 	Michigan	
 Hugh Lowery, tackle, 7 games, 220 pounds, 6' 0", Indiana, Franklin (IN)
 Birtie Maher, end, 2 games, 180 pounds, 5' 8", Univ. Detroit
 McCoy, 1 game, 175 pounds
 Blake Miller, 2 games, 170 pounds, 5' 7", Michigan St.	
 Eddie Moegle, 1 game, 186 pounds, 5' 9", Univ. Detroit
 Gil Runkel, center, 7 games, 210 pounds
 Heinie Schultz, 1 game, 182 pounds, 5' 10"
 Don Straw, guard, 1 game, 210 pounds, 5' 11", Washington & Jefferson
 Ernest Watson, 2 games, 155 pounds, 5' 8", Olivet
 Ray Whipple, end, 5 games, 170 pounds, 5' 9", Notre Dame
 Perce Wilson, back, 7 games, 150 pounds
 Wood, fullback, 2 games

References 

Detroit Heralds seasons
Detroit Heralds
Detroit Heralds